Valentino is an Italian surname. Notable people with the name include:

 Bobby Valentino (American singer) (born Robert Wilson, 1980), now known as Bobby V
 Bobby Valentino (British musician) (born c. 1954), British violinist, singer, songwriter and actor
 Henri Valentino (1785–1865), French conductor
 Jim Valentino (born 1952), American comic book creator
 Robert Valentine (composer) (c. 1671–1747), Anglo-Italian composer also known as Roberto Valentino
 Rudolph Valentino (1895–1926), Italian-American silent film actor, known simply as Valentino
 Sal Valentino (born 1942), lead singer of The Beau Brummels
 Thomas J. Valentino (died 1986), American businessman, among the first to develop libraries of sound effects and taped music
 Val Valentino (born 1956), American magician, illusionist, and actor using the stage name the Masked Magician

See also

 Valentino (given name)
 
 Valentine (name)
 Valentini (surname)
 Valentinov, Russian surname
 Valentino (disambiguation)

Italian-language surnames